Leila Mourad or Layla Morad (February 17, 1918 – November 21, 1995) was an Egyptian singer and actress, and one of the most prominent superstars in Egypt and the entire Arab world in her era. Born Lilian Zaki Ibrahim Mourad to an Egyptian Jewish family, known for their patriotism in 1918 in the El Daher District in Cairo, she later changed her name to Leila Mourad as a stage-name. Leila married three times and divorced three times. She died in 1995.

Life 

Leila Mourad was born on February 17, 1918, to Zaki Mourad and Gamilah Ibrahim Roushou, the daughter of Ibrahim Roushou, a local concert contractor in the early 20th century who regularly booked Zaki Mourad to sing at concerts and wedding parties. Her father was a respected singer, musician, and religious Jewish cantor (Hazzan). One of her brothers, Mounir Mourad, was an actor and composer.

She made her first stage appearance, aged nine, at the Saalat Badi'a, one of Cairo's most successful Music Halls. The theatre had been founded in 1926 by the actress and dancer Badia Masabni, who became Mourad's patron. Her first film appearance, aged fifteen, was in the 1932 " Al-Dahaaya " (The Victims) which had originally been made as a silent film. Her song, The Day of Departure, was added as part of the transformation of the production into a "talkie".

She was trained by her father and Dawood Hosni, who was also Jewish. Hosni had composed the first operetta in the Arabic language, and he composed two songs for Leila: Hairana Leh Bein El-Eloub (Why can't you choose from among lovers), and Howa el dala'a ya'ani khessam (Does daliance mean avoiding me?). Further success came when the prominent Egyptian composer Mohammed Abdel Wahab heard her singing and gave her a role in his film Yahia el Hob (Viva Love!) in 1938. In the six years following the success of Yahia el Hob she made five best selling films with director Togo Mizrahi, becoming Egypt's top actress. In 1945 she made Layla Bint al-Fuqara ("Layla, daughter of the poor") directed by Anwar Wagdi whom she married shortly after. She went on to make a further 20 films of which the most outstanding is Ghazel el-Banat ("The Flirtation of Girls"), also directed and co-starring Wagdi. It also featured Nagib al-Rihani and Abdel Wahab in their last appearances on film.

In 1953, she was selected, over Umm Kulthum, as the official singer of the Egyptian revolution.  Shortly thereafter, a rumor that Mourad had visited Israel, where she had family, and donated money to its military, raised suspicions of spying and caused some Arab radio stations to boycott her. She denied these allegations . No proof was found that she had contributed money to Israel's military; the Egyptian government investigated and concluded that the charges against the singer were without foundation.

Her decision to retire, aged 38, came with the failure of her last film, Al Habib al Majhoul (The Unknown Lover), the banning of her song, With Unity, Order, and Work, praising the Free Officers 1952 revolution and the outbreak of the 1956 war. Despite the immense popularity of her films her singing career was over-shadowed by Um Kulthum who dominated Egypt's musical landscape and, in 1949, had become president of the Musicians' Union. In the early 1950s other singers also popular with younger audiences, such as Abdel al Halim Hafez, did not get the same exposure on the radio as Um Kulthum.

Leila Mourad's relationship with her family was not an easy one, possibly due to money . She didn't change her name and religion on her identity card . Between 1967 and 1970, hundreds of Egyptian Jewish males were deported to the prisons of Abu Zaabal and Tora, including one of Leila's brothers, Isak Zaki. Families of the detainees were allowed to visit beginning in 1968, and some noted that Leila was never seen visiting her brother.
 
Leila Mourad made a few brief reappearances during Ramadan in 1970, when she was scheduled to read Salah Jaheen's "Fawazeer Ramadan" (Ramadan' puzzles), a daily traditional radio program held during the Holy month of Ramadan.

Leila Mourad died in a Cairo hospital in 1995.

Marriages 
Leila Mourad married Anwar Wagdi (married 1945 –  divorced 1953), over the objection of her father. She married  him and divorced.  Leila gave the reason for her divorce as the fact that she was not fully aware of the seriousness of Wagdi's illness, one that made him constantly irritable and difficult to live with. Later she married  secretly Wagih Abaza (married 1955 – divorced 1956)  and gave birth to Ashraf Wagih Abaza and divorced   .  Then  she married a film director Fatin Abdel Wahab 1957 and she gave birth to their son Zaki Fatin Abdel Wahab, and finally divorced in 1969.

Works 

Almost all of Laila Mourad's most popular songs are from her musical films.

 "Yama Arak El-Nasim" (How Calm the Breeze is) from Yahya El-Hob (1938)
 "Ghany Ya Tair" (Sing, Bird) from Laila Bint Madares (1941) 
 "Meen Yishtary El-Ward Minni" (Who Will But Flowers From Me?) from Laila (1942)
 "El-Habib" (The Lover) from Laila (1942)
 "Hagabt Noorak Anny" (You've Hidden Your Light From Me) from Laila (1942)
 "Elli fi Albo Haga Yis'alny" (Whoever Has Something In Their Heart, Tell Me) from Laila, Daughter of the Poor (1945)
 "Leila Gameelah" (What a Beautiful Night!) from Laila, Daughter of the Poor (1945) 
 "Ehna El-Etnein" (The Two Of Us) from Laila, Daughter of the Poor (1945)
 "Monaya fi Korbak" (I Wish to be By Your Side) from Al-Madi Al-Majhoul (1946)
 "Enta Sa'ida" (Good Day) from Alby Dalili (1947)
 "Edhak Karkar" (Laugh and Chuckle) from Alby Dalili (1947) 
 "Alby Dalili" (My Heart is My Guide) from Alby Dalili (1947)
 "Sa'alt Aleh" (I Asked About Him) from Anbar (1948)
 "Dous Al-Donya" (Step on the World) from Anbar (1948)
 "Etmakhtary Ya Kheil" (Trot, My Horse) from Ghazal El-Banat (1949)
 "El Hob Gameel" (Love Is Beautiful) from Ghazal El-Banat (1949)
 "Abgad Hawaz" (The ABC's) from Ghazal el-Banat (1949)
 "Einy Betref" (My Eye Wanders) a duet with the Egyptian actor "Naguib AlRaihani", from Ghazal El-Banat (1949)
 "El Donya Ghenwa" (The World is a Song) from Ghazal el-Banat (1949) 
 "Ya Msafer W Nasy Hawak" (Traveller, You Have Forgotten Your Heart) from Shati' Al-Gharam (1950)
 "El-Maya Wel Hawa" (The Water and the Wind) from Shati' Al-Gharam (1950)
 "Ya Aaz Min Einy" (Dearer Than My Eyes) from Shati' Al-Gharam (1950)
 "Hakak Alaya" (It's My Fault) from Habib Al-Rouh (1951) 
 "Es'al Alaya" (Ask About Me) from Al-Hayat Al-Hob (1954)
 "Otlob Enaya" (Ask for my Eyes) from Al-Hayat Al-Hob (1954) 
 "Leh Khaletni Ahebbak" (Why Did You Let Me Love You) from Al-Habib Al-Majhoul (1955)
 "Bil Nizam Wal-Amal Wal-Etihad" (With Order, Work, and Unity) (1953) An anthem for the Egyptian Revolution that was commissioned by the new government led by President Mohamed Naguib.  This song was banned when Gemal Abdelnasser ousted Naguib. 
 "Sanatein W Ana Ahayel Feek" (For Two Years I've Waited For You)

Laila Mourad has starred in 27 film between 1938 and 1955. This list does not include her appearance in El-Dahaya (The Victims) (1935) in which she only recorded songs for the film, but did not actually appear in it.

Legacy 
The Ramadan television series " Ana Albi Dalili " (named after one of her songs), about the life of Leila Mourad, debuted in 2009. It is an Egyptian production headed by Syrian director Muhamad Zuhair Rajab. Jordanian actress Safa Sultan plays Leila Mourad. Egypt's Ahmed Falawkas portrays Anwar Wagdi. Ezzat Abou Aouf, an Egyptian actor, portrays Zaki Mourad and Egyptian actress Hala Fakher portrays Miriam, the aunt of Leila Mourad.

References

External links 

 

1918 births
1995 deaths
Egyptian film actresses
20th-century Egyptian women singers
Egyptian people of Jewish descent
Egyptian Muslims
Actresses from Cairo
Singers from Cairo
Converts to Islam from Judaism
20th-century Egyptian actresses
Singers who perform in Egyptian Arabic